Lyal Vernon Keighran (12 September 1923 – 4 November 2012) was an Australian rules footballer who played with South Melbourne in the Victorian Football League (VFL). He served in the Australian Army during World War II.

Notes

External links 

1923 births
2012 deaths
Australian Army personnel of World War II
Australian rules footballers from Victoria (Australia)
Sydney Swans players